This is a list of major political scandals in France.

Until 1958
1789: Réveillon riots - popular revolt from April 26- 28, in the Faubourg Saint-Antoine, Paris. Considered a precursor to the Storming of the Bastille and the French Revolution.
1797: XYZ Affair - a political and diplomatic episode involving confrontation with the United States that led to the Quasi-War. 
1847: Teste-Cubières corruption scandal, revealed in May 1847
1847: Charles de Choiseul-Praslin's suicide after having murdered his wife, daughter of Horace Sébastiani, minister of the July Monarchy
1880s: Georges Ernest Boulanger affair
1887: Schnaebele incident
1887: Wilson scandal, which led to the resignation of President Jules Grévy
1890s: Panama scandals
1894: Dreyfus affair, treason conviction of Alfred Dreyfus, exposed by writer Émile Zola on 13 January 1898
1928: Marthe Hanau affair
1930: Albert Oustric affair
1934: Stavisky Affair, embezzlement and political corruption
1949: the Generals Affair, a political-military scandal during the First Indochina War
1950: the Henri Martin Affair, a political-military scandal during the First Indochina War
1958: the ballets roses, a scandal most notably involving then President of the Senate, André Le Troquer, in which a group of girls aged 15 to 17 performed "ballets" that ended in orgies

Under the Fifth Republic

1965: the Ben Barka affair, disappearance of the Moroccan opposition leader Mehdi Ben Barka.
1968: The Markovic affair
1974:
Eurodif affair
Cardinal Jean Daniélou's death in the house of a prostitute
Le Monde reveals the existence of the SAFARI government database, prompting the creation of the CNIL agency in charge of respect of civil rights and data privacy.
1979:
Robert Boulin affair; a minister of the third Raymond Barre government, Boulin was found dead in mysterious circumstances on 30 October 1979
Diamonds Affair involving Bokassa
1981: the Canard enchaîné uncovered the collaborationist role of former official Maurice Papon under Vichy France; the latter would eventually be convicted of crimes against humanity
1985: sinking of the Rainbow Warrior by the French DGSE intelligence agency
1986: Chernobyl disaster, Jacques Chirac's government wrongly alleged that the "radioactive cloud" had stopped at the French borders
1987–1988: Iskandar Safa and the Hostage Scandal involving Prime Minister Jacques Chirac and Interior Minister Charles Pasqua
1980s: contaminated blood scandal
The Canard enchaîné satirical newspaper fought to bring to light evidence of alleged corruption during President Jacques Chirac's tenure as Mayor of Paris.
1990s: Angolagate (arms-for-oil scandal)
La Fayette scandal
1994: Yann Piat affair; a former National Front MP, assassinated on 25 February 1994)
1994: Dauphiné News affair; Minister Alain Carignon indicted, later sentenced to 29 months in prison
1998: affair Elf-Dumas
1999: "Affair of the beach huts", leading to the arrest of prefect Bernard Bonnet
2005: the revelations of the Canard enchaîné on Finance Minister Hervé Gaymard's (UMP) lavish state-funded apartment led to his resignation in 2005
2006: Clearstream affair allegedly involving Prime Minister Dominique de Villepin (UMP) accused of attempting to discredit his political rivals, including UMP Leader Nicolas Sarkozy, by spreading false allegations concerning the Taiwan frigates scandal.
 Since 2010
 Bettencourt affair
 Karachi affair
 Sylvie Andrieux affair
 Alleged Libyan financing in the 2007 French presidential election
 Cahuzac affair
 2012 UMP leadership election fraud accusations
 Thomas Thevenoud affair
 Kader Arif affair
 Bruno Le Roux affair
 Fillon affair
 Benalla affair
 Richard Ferrand affair

See also
Balladur jurisprudence, concerning ministers indicted by the justice
Le Canard Enchaîné, an investigative satirical newspaper which uncovered many scandals
Outreau affair, a judicial scandal
Corruption in France

References

External links
 The Bettencourt/L'Oréal scandal Radio France Internationale in English
 French politics no stranger to scandals Radio France Internationale in English
 L'Oréal, scandals and the far right Radio France Internationale in English
 Liste d'affaires politico-financières françaises List Of French Financial Political Scandals in French

 
Scandals
Scandals
France
Scandals